A chemical element is a chemical substance that cannot be broken down into other substances. The basic particle that constitutes a chemical element is the atom, and chemical elements are distinguished from each other by the number of protons in the nuclei of their atoms. This is in contrast to chemical compounds and mixtures.

Almost all of the baryonic matter of the universe is composed of chemical elements (among rare exceptions are neutron stars).  When different elements undergo chemical reactions, atoms are rearranged into new compounds held together by chemical bonds. Only a minority of elements, such as silver and gold, are found uncombined as relatively pure native element minerals. Nearly all other naturally occurring elements occur in the Earth as compounds or mixtures. Air is primarily a mixture of the elements nitrogen, oxygen, and argon, though it does contain compounds including carbon dioxide and water.

The history of the discovery and use of the elements began with primitive human societies that discovered native minerals like carbon, sulfur, copper and gold (though the concept of a chemical element was not yet understood). Attempts to classify materials such as these resulted in the concepts of classical elements, alchemy, and various similar theories throughout human history.  Much of the modern understanding of elements developed from the work of Dmitri Mendeleev, a Russian chemist who published the first recognizable periodic table in 1869. This table organizes the elements by increasing atomic number into rows ("periods") in which the columns ("groups") share recurring ("periodic") physical and chemical properties. The periodic table summarizes various properties of the elements, allowing chemists to derive relationships between them and to make predictions about compounds and potential new ones.

By November 2016, the International Union of Pure and Applied Chemistry had recognized a total of 118 elements. The first 94 occur naturally on Earth, and the remaining 24 are synthetic elements produced in nuclear reactions. Save for unstable radioactive elements (radionuclides) which decay quickly, nearly all of the elements are available industrially in varying amounts.  The discovery and synthesis of further new elements is an ongoing area of scientific study.

Description 
The lightest chemical elements are hydrogen and helium, both created by Big Bang nucleosynthesis during the first 20 minutes of the universe in a ratio of around 3:1 by mass (or 12:1 by number of atoms), along with tiny traces of the next two elements, lithium and beryllium. Almost all other elements found in nature were made by various natural methods of nucleosynthesis. On Earth, small amounts of new atoms are naturally produced in nucleogenic reactions, or in cosmogenic processes, such as cosmic ray spallation. New atoms are also naturally produced on Earth as radiogenic daughter isotopes of ongoing radioactive decay processes such as alpha decay, beta decay, spontaneous fission, cluster decay, and other rarer modes of decay.

Of the 94 naturally occurring elements, those with atomic numbers 1 through 82 each have at least one stable isotope (except for technetium, element 43 and promethium, element 61, which have no stable isotopes). Isotopes considered stable are those for which no radioactive decay has yet been observed. Elements with atomic numbers 83 through 94 are unstable to the point that radioactive decay of all isotopes can be detected. Some of these elements, notably bismuth (atomic number 83), thorium (atomic number 90), and uranium (atomic number 92), have one or more isotopes with half-lives long enough to survive as remnants of the explosive stellar nucleosynthesis that produced the heavy metals before the formation of our Solar System. At over 1.9 years, over a billion times longer than the current estimated age of the universe, bismuth-209 (atomic number 83) has the longest known alpha decay half-life of any naturally occurring element, and is almost always considered on par with the 80 stable elements. The very heaviest elements (those beyond plutonium, element 94) undergo radioactive decay with half-lives so short that they are not found in nature and must be synthesized.

There are now 118 known elements. In this context, "known" means observed well enough, even from just a few decay products, to have been differentiated from other elements. Most recently, the synthesis of element 118 (since named oganesson) was reported in October 2006, and the synthesis of element 117 (tennessine) was reported in April 2010. Of these 118 elements, 94 occur naturally on Earth. Six of these occur in extreme trace quantities: technetium, atomic number 43; promethium, number 61; astatine, number 85; francium, number 87; neptunium, number 93; and plutonium, number 94. These 94 elements have been detected in the universe at large, in the spectra of stars and also supernovae, where short-lived radioactive elements are newly being made. The first 94 elements have been detected directly on Earth as primordial nuclides present from the formation of the Solar System, or as naturally occurring fission or transmutation products of uranium and thorium.

The remaining 24 heavier elements, not found today either on Earth or in astronomical spectra, have been produced artificially: these are all radioactive, with very short half-lives; if any atoms of these elements were present at the formation of Earth, they are extremely likely, to the point of certainty, to have already decayed, and if present in novae have been in quantities too small to have been noted. Technetium was the first purportedly non-naturally occurring element synthesized, in 1937, although trace amounts of technetium have since been found in nature (and also the element may have been discovered naturally in 1925). This pattern of artificial production and later natural discovery has been repeated with several other radioactive naturally occurring rare elements.

List of the elements are available by name, atomic number, density, melting point, boiling point and by symbol, as well as ionization energies of the elements. The nuclides of stable and radioactive elements are also available as a list of nuclides, sorted by length of half-life for those that are unstable. One of the most convenient, and certainly the most traditional presentation of the elements, is in the form of the periodic table, which groups together elements with similar chemical properties (and usually also similar electronic structures).

Atomic number 

The atomic number of an element is equal to the number of protons in each atom, and defines the element. For example, all carbon atoms contain 6 protons in their atomic nucleus; so the atomic number of carbon is 6. Carbon atoms may have different numbers of neutrons; atoms of the same element having different numbers of neutrons are known as isotopes of the element.

The number of protons in the atomic nucleus also determines its electric charge, which in turn determines the number of electrons of the atom in its non-ionized state. The electrons are placed into atomic orbitals that determine the atom's various chemical properties. The number of neutrons in a nucleus usually has very little effect on an element's chemical properties (except in the case of hydrogen and deuterium). Thus, all carbon isotopes have nearly identical chemical properties because they all have six protons and six electrons, even though carbon atoms may, for example, have 6 or 8 neutrons. That is why the atomic number, rather than mass number or atomic weight, is considered the identifying characteristic of a chemical element.

The symbol for atomic number is Z.

Isotopes 

Isotopes are atoms of the same element (that is, with the same number of protons in their atomic nucleus), but having different numbers of neutrons. Thus, for example, there are three main isotopes of carbon. All carbon atoms have 6 protons in the nucleus, but they can have either 6, 7, or 8 neutrons. Since the mass numbers of these are 12, 13 and 14 respectively, the three isotopes of carbon are known as carbon-12, carbon-13, and carbon-14, often abbreviated to 12C, 13C, and 14C. Carbon in everyday life and in chemistry is a mixture of 12C (about 98.9%), 13C (about 1.1%) and about 1 atom per trillion of 14C.

Most (66 of 94) naturally occurring elements have more than one stable isotope. Except for the isotopes of hydrogen (which differ greatly from each other in relative mass—enough to cause chemical effects), the isotopes of a given element are chemically nearly indistinguishable.

All of the elements have some isotopes that are radioactive (radioisotopes), although not all of these radioisotopes occur naturally. The radioisotopes typically decay into other elements upon radiating an alpha or beta particle. If an element has isotopes that are not radioactive, these are termed "stable" isotopes. All of the known stable isotopes occur naturally (see primordial isotope). The many radioisotopes that are not found in nature have been characterized after being artificially made. Certain elements have no stable isotopes and are composed only of radioactive isotopes: specifically the elements without any stable isotopes are technetium (atomic number 43), promethium (atomic number 61), and all observed elements with atomic numbers greater than 82.

Of the 80 elements with at least one stable isotope, 26 have only one single stable isotope. The mean number of stable isotopes for the 80 stable elements is 3.1 stable isotopes per element. The largest number of stable isotopes that occur for a single element is 10 (for tin, element 50).

Isotopic mass and atomic mass 

The mass number of an element, A, is the number of nucleons (protons and neutrons) in the atomic nucleus. Different isotopes of a given element are distinguished by their mass numbers, which are conventionally written as a superscript on the left hand side of the atomic symbol (e.g. 238U). The mass number is always a whole number and has units of "nucleons". For example, magnesium-24 (24 is the mass number) is an atom with 24 nucleons (12 protons and 12 neutrons).

Whereas the mass number simply counts the total number of neutrons and protons and is thus a natural (or whole) number, the atomic mass of a single atom is a real number giving the mass of a particular isotope (or "nuclide") of the element, expressed in atomic mass units (symbol: u). In general, the mass number of a given nuclide differs in value slightly from its atomic mass, since the mass of each proton and neutron is not exactly 1 u; since the electrons contribute a lesser share to the atomic mass as neutron number exceeds proton number; and (finally) because of the nuclear binding energy. For example, the atomic mass of chlorine-35 to five significant digits is 34.969 u and that of chlorine-37 is 36.966 u. However, the atomic mass in u of each isotope is quite close to its simple mass number (always within 1%). The only isotope whose atomic mass is exactly a natural number is 12C, which by definition has a mass of exactly 12 because u is defined as 1/12 of the mass of a free neutral carbon-12 atom in the ground state.

The standard atomic weight (commonly called "atomic weight") of an element is the average of the atomic masses of all the chemical element's isotopes as found in a particular environment, weighted by isotopic abundance, relative to the atomic mass unit. This number may be a fraction that is not close to a whole number. For example, the relative atomic mass of chlorine is 35.453 u, which differs greatly from a whole number as it is an average of about 76% chlorine-35 and 24% chlorine-37. Whenever a relative atomic mass value differs by more than 1% from a whole number, it is due to this averaging effect, as significant amounts of more than one isotope are naturally present in a sample of that element.

Chemically pure and isotopically pure 
Chemists and nuclear scientists have different definitions of a pure element. In chemistry, a pure element means a substance whose atoms all (or in practice almost all) have the same atomic number, or number of protons. Nuclear scientists, however, define a pure element as one that consists of only one stable isotope.

For example, a copper wire is 99.99% chemically pure if 99.99% of its atoms are copper, with 29 protons each. However it is not isotopically pure since ordinary copper consists of two stable isotopes, 69% 63Cu and 31% 65Cu, with different numbers of neutrons. However, a pure gold ingot would be both chemically and isotopically pure, since ordinary gold consists only of one isotope, 197Au.

Allotropes 

Atoms of chemically pure elements may bond to each other chemically in more than one way, allowing the pure element to exist in multiple chemical structures (spatial arrangements of atoms), known as allotropes, which differ in their properties. For example, carbon can be found as diamond, which has a tetrahedral structure around each carbon atom; graphite, which has layers of carbon atoms with a hexagonal structure stacked on top of each other; graphene, which is a single layer of graphite that is very strong; fullerenes, which have nearly spherical shapes; and carbon nanotubes, which are tubes with a hexagonal structure (even these may differ from each other in electrical properties). The ability of an element to exist in one of many structural forms is known as 'allotropy'.

The reference state of an element is defined by convention, usually as the thermodynamically most stable allotrope and physical state at a pressure of 1 bar and a given temperature (typically at 298.15K). However, for phosphorus, the reference state is white phosphorus even though it is not the most stable allotrope. In thermochemistry, an element is defined to have an enthalpy of formation of zero in its reference state. For example, the reference state for carbon is graphite, because the structure of graphite is more stable than that of the other allotropes.

Properties 
Several kinds of descriptive categorizations can be applied broadly to the elements, including consideration of their general physical and chemical properties, their states of matter under familiar conditions, their melting and boiling points, their densities, their crystal structures as solids, and their origins.

General properties 
Several terms are commonly used to characterize the general physical and chemical properties of the chemical elements. A first distinction is between metals, which readily conduct electricity, nonmetals, which do not, and a small group, (the metalloids), having intermediate properties and often behaving as semiconductors.

A more refined classification is often shown in colored presentations of the periodic table. This system restricts the terms "metal" and "nonmetal" to only certain of the more broadly defined metals and nonmetals, adding additional terms for certain sets of the more broadly viewed metals and nonmetals. The version of this classification used in the periodic tables presented here includes: actinides, alkali metals, alkaline earth metals, halogens, lanthanides, transition metals, post-transition metals, metalloids, reactive nonmetals, and noble gases. In this system, the alkali metals, alkaline earth metals, and transition metals, as well as the lanthanides and the actinides, are special groups of the metals viewed in a broader sense. Similarly, the reactive nonmetals and the noble gases are nonmetals viewed in the broader sense. In some presentations, the halogens are not distinguished, with astatine identified as a metalloid and the others identified as nonmetals.

States of matter 
Another commonly used basic distinction among the elements is their state of matter (phase), whether solid, liquid, or gas, at a selected standard temperature and pressure (STP). Most of the elements are solids at conventional temperatures and atmospheric pressure, while several are gases. Only bromine and mercury are liquids at 0 degrees Celsius (32 degrees Fahrenheit) and normal atmospheric pressure; caesium and gallium are solids at that temperature, but melt at 28.4 °C (83.2 °F) and 29.8 °C (85.6 °F), respectively.

Melting and boiling points 
Melting and boiling points, typically expressed in degrees Celsius at a pressure of one atmosphere, are commonly used in characterizing the various elements. While known for most elements, either or both of these measurements is still undetermined for some of the radioactive elements available in only tiny quantities. Since helium remains a liquid even at absolute zero at atmospheric pressure, it has only a boiling point, and not a melting point, in conventional presentations.

Densities 

The density at selected standard temperature and pressure (STP) is frequently used in characterizing the elements. Density is often expressed in grams per cubic centimeter (g/cm3). Since several elements are gases at commonly encountered temperatures, their densities are usually stated for their gaseous forms; when liquefied or solidified, the gaseous elements have densities similar to those of the other elements.

When an element has allotropes with different densities, one representative allotrope is typically selected in summary presentations, while densities for each allotrope can be stated where more detail is provided. For example, the three familiar allotropes of carbon (amorphous carbon, graphite, and diamond) have densities of 1.8–2.1, 2.267, and 3.515 g/cm3, respectively.

Crystal structures 

The elements studied to date as solid samples have eight kinds of crystal structures: cubic, body-centered cubic, face-centered cubic, hexagonal, monoclinic, orthorhombic, rhombohedral, and tetragonal. For some of the synthetically produced transuranic elements, available samples have been too small to determine crystal structures.

Occurrence and origin on Earth 

Chemical elements may also be categorized by their origin on Earth, with the first 94 considered naturally occurring, while those with atomic numbers beyond 94 have only been produced artificially as the synthetic products of man-made nuclear reactions.

Of the 94 naturally occurring elements, 83 are considered primordial and either stable or weakly radioactive. The remaining 11 naturally occurring elements possess half lives too short for them to have been present at the beginning of the Solar System, and are therefore considered transient elements. Of these 11 transient elements, 5 (polonium, radon, radium, actinium, and protactinium) are relatively common decay products of thorium and uranium. The remaining 6 transient elements (technetium, promethium, astatine, francium, neptunium, and plutonium) occur only rarely, as products of rare decay modes or nuclear reaction processes involving uranium or other heavy elements.

No radioactive decay has been observed for elements with atomic numbers 1 through 82, except 43 (technetium) and 61 (promethium). Observationally stable isotopes of some elements (such as tungsten and lead), however, are predicted to be slightly radioactive with very long half-lives: for example, the half-lives predicted for the observationally stable lead isotopes range from 1035 to 10189 years. Elements with atomic numbers 43, 61, and 83 through 94 are unstable enough that their radioactive decay can readily be detected. Three of these elements, bismuth (element 83), thorium (element 90), and uranium (element 92) have one or more isotopes with half-lives long enough to survive as remnants of the explosive stellar nucleosynthesis that produced the heavy elements before the formation of the Solar System. For example, at over 1.9 years, over a billion times longer than the current estimated age of the universe, bismuth-209 has the longest known alpha decay half-life of any naturally occurring element. The very heaviest 24 elements (those beyond plutonium, element 94) undergo radioactive decay with short half-lives and cannot be produced as daughters of longer-lived elements, and thus are not known to occur in nature at all.

Periodic table 

The properties of the chemical elements are often summarized using the periodic table, which powerfully and elegantly organizes the elements by increasing atomic number into rows ("periods") in which the columns ("groups") share recurring ("periodic") physical and chemical properties. The current standard table contains 118 confirmed elements as of 2021.

Although earlier precursors to this presentation exist, its invention is generally credited to the Russian chemist Dmitri Mendeleev in 1869, who intended the table to illustrate recurring trends in the properties of the elements. The layout of the table has been refined and extended over time as new elements have been discovered and new theoretical models have been developed to explain chemical behavior.

Use of the periodic table is now ubiquitous within the academic discipline of chemistry, providing an extremely useful framework to classify, systematize and compare all the many different forms of chemical behavior. The table has also found wide application in physics, geology, biology, materials science, engineering, agriculture, medicine, nutrition, environmental health, and astronomy. Its principles are especially important in chemical engineering.

Nomenclature and symbols 

The various chemical elements are formally identified by their unique atomic numbers, by their accepted names, and by their symbols.

Atomic numbers
The known elements have atomic numbers from 1 through 118, conventionally presented as Arabic numerals. Since the elements can be uniquely sequenced by atomic number, conventionally from lowest to highest (as in a periodic table), sets of elements are sometimes specified by such notation as "through", "beyond", or "from ... through", as in "through iron", "beyond uranium", or "from lanthanum through lutetium". The terms "light" and "heavy" are sometimes also used informally to indicate relative atomic numbers (not densities), as in "lighter than carbon" or "heavier than lead", although technically the weight or mass of atoms of an element (their atomic weights or atomic masses) do not always increase monotonically with their atomic numbers.

Element names

The naming of various substances now known as elements precedes the atomic theory of matter, as names were given locally by various cultures to various minerals, metals, compounds, alloys, mixtures, and other materials, although at the time it was not known which chemicals were elements and which compounds. As they were identified as elements, the existing names for anciently known elements (e.g., gold, mercury, iron) were kept in most countries. National differences emerged over the names of elements either for convenience, linguistic niceties, or nationalism. For a few illustrative examples: German speakers use "Wasserstoff" (water substance) for "hydrogen", "Sauerstoff" (acid substance) for "oxygen" and "Stickstoff" (smothering substance) for "nitrogen", while English and some romance languages use "sodium" for "natrium" and "potassium" for "kalium", and the French, Italians, Greeks, Portuguese and Poles prefer "azote/azot/azoto" (from roots meaning "no life") for "nitrogen".

For purposes of international communication and trade, the official names of the chemical elements both ancient and more recently recognized are decided by the International Union of Pure and Applied Chemistry (IUPAC), which has decided on a sort of international English language, drawing on traditional English names even when an element's chemical symbol is based on a Latin or other traditional word, for example adopting "gold" rather than "aurum" as the name for the 79th element (Au). IUPAC prefers the British spellings "aluminium" and "caesium" over the U.S. spellings "aluminum" and "cesium", and the U.S. "sulfur" over the British "sulphur". However, elements that are practical to sell in bulk in many countries often still have locally used national names, and countries whose national language does not use the Latin alphabet are likely to use the IUPAC element names.

According to IUPAC, chemical elements are not proper nouns in English; consequently, the full name of an element is not routinely capitalized in English, even if derived from a proper noun, as in californium and einsteinium. Isotope names of chemical elements are also uncapitalized if written out, e.g., carbon-12 or uranium-235. Chemical element symbols (such as Cf for californium and Es for einsteinium), are always capitalized (see below).

In the second half of the twentieth century, physics laboratories became able to produce nuclei of chemical elements with half-lives too short for an appreciable amount of them to exist at any time. These are also named by IUPAC, which generally adopts the name chosen by the discoverer. This practice can lead to the controversial question of which research group actually discovered an element, a question that delayed the naming of elements with atomic number of 104 and higher for a considerable amount of time. (See element naming controversy).

Precursors of such controversies involved the nationalistic namings of elements in the late 19th century. For example, lutetium was named in reference to Paris, France. The Germans were reluctant to relinquish naming rights to the French, often calling it cassiopeium. Similarly, the British discoverer of niobium originally named it columbium, in reference to the New World. It was used extensively as such by American publications before the international standardization (in 1950).

Chemical symbols

Specific chemical elements
Before chemistry became a science, alchemists had designed arcane symbols for both metals and common compounds. These were however used as abbreviations in diagrams or procedures; there was no concept of atoms combining to form molecules. With his advances in the atomic theory of matter, John Dalton devised his own simpler symbols, based on circles, to depict molecules.

The current system of chemical notation was invented by Berzelius. In this typographical system, chemical symbols are not mere abbreviations—though each consists of letters of the Latin alphabet. They are intended as universal symbols for people of all languages and alphabets.

The first of these symbols were intended to be fully universal. Since Latin was the common language of science at that time, they were abbreviations based on the Latin names of metals. Cu comes from cuprum, Fe comes from ferrum, Ag from argentum. The symbols were not followed by a period (full stop) as with abbreviations. Later chemical elements were also assigned unique chemical symbols, based on the name of the element, but not necessarily in English. For example, sodium has the chemical symbol 'Na' after the Latin natrium. The same applies to "Fe" (ferrum) for iron, "Hg" (hydrargyrum) for mercury, "Sn" (stannum) for tin, "Au" (aurum) for gold, "Ag" (argentum) for silver, "Pb" (plumbum) for lead, "Cu" (cuprum) for copper, and "Sb" (stibium) for antimony. "W" (wolfram) for tungsten ultimately derives from German, "K" (kalium) for potassium ultimately from Arabic.

Chemical symbols are understood internationally when element names might require translation. There have sometimes been differences in the past. For example, Germans in the past have used "J" (for the alternate name Jod) for iodine, but now use "I" and "Iod".

The first letter of a chemical symbol is always capitalized, as in the preceding examples, and the subsequent letters, if any, are always lower case (small letters). Thus, the symbols for californium and einsteinium are Cf and Es.

General chemical symbols
There are also symbols in chemical equations for groups of chemical elements, for example in comparative formulas. These are often a single capital letter, and the letters are reserved and not used for names of specific elements. For example, an "X" indicates a variable group (usually a halogen) in a class of compounds, while "R" is a radical, meaning a compound structure such as a hydrocarbon chain. The letter "Q" is reserved for "heat" in a chemical reaction. "Y" is also often used as a general chemical symbol, although it is also the symbol of yttrium. "Z" is also frequently used as a general variable group. "E" is used in organic chemistry to denote an electron-withdrawing group or an electrophile; similarly "Nu" denotes a nucleophile. "L" is used to represent a general ligand in inorganic and organometallic chemistry. "M" is also often used in place of a general metal.

At least two additional, two-letter generic chemical symbols are also in informal usage, "Ln" for any lanthanide element and "An" for any actinide element. "Rg" was formerly used for any rare gas element, but the group of rare gases has now been renamed noble gases and the symbol "Rg" has now been assigned to the element roentgenium.

Isotope symbols
Isotopes are distinguished by the atomic mass number (total protons and neutrons) for a particular isotope of an element, with this number combined with the pertinent element's symbol. IUPAC prefers that isotope symbols be written in superscript notation when practical, for example 12C and 235U. However, other notations, such as carbon-12 and uranium-235, or C-12 and U-235, are also used.

As a special case, the three naturally occurring isotopes of the element hydrogen are often specified as H for 1H (protium), D for 2H (deuterium), and T for 3H (tritium). This convention is easier to use in chemical equations, replacing the need to write out the mass number for each atom. For example, the formula for heavy water may be written D2O instead of 2H2O.

Origin of the elements

Only about 4% of the total mass of the universe is made of atoms or ions, and thus represented by chemical elements. This fraction is about 15% of the total matter, with the remainder of the matter (85%) being dark matter. The nature of dark matter is unknown, but it is not composed of atoms of chemical elements because it contains no protons, neutrons, or electrons. (The remaining non-matter part of the mass of the universe is composed of the even less well understood dark energy).

The 94 naturally occurring chemical elements were produced by at least four classes of astrophysical process. Most of the hydrogen, helium and a very small quantity of lithium were produced in the first few minutes of the Big Bang. This Big Bang nucleosynthesis happened only once; the other processes are ongoing. Nuclear fusion inside stars produces elements through stellar nucleosynthesis, including all elements from carbon to iron in atomic number. Elements higher in atomic number than iron, including heavy elements like uranium and plutonium, are produced by various forms of explosive nucleosynthesis in supernovae and neutron star mergers. The light elements lithium, beryllium and boron are produced mostly through cosmic ray spallation (fragmentation induced by cosmic rays) of carbon, nitrogen, and oxygen.

During the early phases of the Big Bang, nucleosynthesis of hydrogen nuclei resulted in the production of hydrogen-1 (protium, 1H) and helium-4 (4He), as well as a smaller amount of deuterium (2H) and very minuscule amounts (on the order of 10−10) of lithium and beryllium. Even smaller amounts of boron may have been produced in the Big Bang, since it has been observed in some very old stars, while carbon has not. No elements heavier than boron were produced in the Big Bang. As a result, the primordial abundance of atoms (or ions) consisted of roughly 75% 1H, 25% 4He, and 0.01% deuterium, with only tiny traces of lithium, beryllium, and perhaps boron. Subsequent enrichment of galactic halos occurred due to stellar nucleosynthesis and supernova nucleosynthesis. However, the element abundance in intergalactic space can still closely resemble primordial conditions, unless it has been enriched by some means.

On Earth (and elsewhere), trace amounts of various elements continue to be produced from other elements as products of nuclear transmutation processes. These include some produced by cosmic rays or other nuclear reactions (see cosmogenic and nucleogenic nuclides), and others produced as decay products of long-lived primordial nuclides. For example, trace (but detectable) amounts of carbon-14 (14C) are continually produced in the atmosphere by cosmic rays impacting nitrogen atoms, and argon-40 (40Ar) is continually produced by the decay of primordially occurring but unstable potassium-40 (40K). Also, three primordially occurring but radioactive actinides, thorium, uranium, and plutonium, decay through a series of recurrently produced but unstable radioactive elements such as radium and radon, which are transiently present in any sample of these metals or their ores or compounds. Three other radioactive elements, technetium, promethium, and neptunium, occur only incidentally in natural materials, produced as individual atoms by nuclear fission of the nuclei of various heavy elements or in other rare nuclear processes.

In addition to the 94 naturally occurring elements, several artificial elements have been produced by human nuclear physics technology. , these experiments have produced all elements up to atomic number 118.

Abundance

The following graph (note log scale) shows the abundance of elements in our Solar System. The table shows the twelve most common elements in our galaxy (estimated spectroscopically), as measured in parts per million, by mass. Nearby galaxies that have evolved along similar lines have a corresponding enrichment of elements heavier than hydrogen and helium. The more distant galaxies are being viewed as they appeared in the past, so their abundances of elements appear closer to the primordial mixture. As physical laws and processes appear common throughout the visible universe, however, scientist expect that these galaxies evolved elements in similar abundance.

The abundance of elements in the Solar System is in keeping with their origin from nucleosynthesis in the Big Bang and a number of progenitor supernova stars. Very abundant hydrogen and helium are products of the Big Bang, but the next three elements are rare since they had little time to form in the Big Bang and are not made in stars (they are, however, produced in small quantities by the breakup of heavier elements in interstellar dust, as a result of impact by cosmic rays). Beginning with carbon, elements are produced in stars by buildup from alpha particles (helium nuclei), resulting in an alternatingly larger abundance of elements with even atomic numbers (these are also more stable). In general, such elements up to iron are made in large stars in the process of becoming supernovas. Iron-56 is particularly common, since it is the most stable element that can easily be made from alpha particles (being a product of decay of radioactive nickel-56, ultimately made from 14 helium nuclei). Elements heavier than iron are made in energy-absorbing processes in large stars, and their abundance in the universe (and on Earth) generally decreases with their atomic number.

The abundance of the chemical elements on Earth varies from air to crust to ocean, and in various types of life. The abundance of elements in Earth's crust differs from that in the Solar System (as seen in the Sun and heavy planets like Jupiter) mainly in selective loss of the very lightest elements (hydrogen and helium) and also volatile neon, carbon (as hydrocarbons), nitrogen and sulfur, as a result of solar heating in the early formation of the solar system. Oxygen, the most abundant Earth element by mass, is retained on Earth by combination with silicon. Aluminum at 8% by mass is more common in the Earth's crust than in the universe and solar system, but the composition of the far more bulky mantle, which has magnesium and iron in place of aluminum (which occurs there only at 2% of mass) more closely mirrors the elemental composition of the solar system, save for the noted loss of volatile elements to space, and loss of iron which has migrated to the Earth's core.

The composition of the human body, by contrast, more closely follows the composition of seawater—save that the human body has additional stores of carbon and nitrogen necessary to form the proteins and nucleic acids, together with phosphorus in the nucleic acids and energy transfer molecule adenosine triphosphate (ATP) that occurs in the cells of all living organisms. Certain kinds of organisms require particular additional elements, for example the magnesium in chlorophyll in green plants, the calcium in mollusc shells, or the iron in the hemoglobin in vertebrate animals' red blood cells.

History

Evolving definitions
The concept of an "element" as an undivisible substance has developed through three major historical phases: Classical definitions (such as those of the ancient Greeks), chemical definitions, and atomic definitions.

Classical definitions
Ancient philosophy posited a set of classical elements to explain observed patterns in nature. These elements originally referred to earth, water, air and fire rather than the chemical elements of modern science.

The term 'elements' (stoicheia) was first used by the Greek philosopher Plato in about 360 BCE in his dialogue Timaeus, which includes a discussion of the composition of inorganic and organic bodies and is a speculative treatise on chemistry. Plato believed the elements introduced a century earlier by Empedocles were composed of small polyhedral forms: tetrahedron (fire), octahedron (air), icosahedron (water), and cube (earth).

Aristotle, c. 350 BCE, also used the term stoicheia and added a fifth element called aether, which formed the heavens. Aristotle defined an element as:

Chemical definitions
In 1661, Robert Boyle proposed his theory of corpuscularism which favoured the analysis of matter as constituted by irreducible units of matter (atoms) and, choosing to side with neither Aristotle's view of the four elements nor Paracelsus' view of three fundamental elements, left open the question of the number of elements. The first modern list of chemical elements was given in Antoine Lavoisier's 1789 Elements of Chemistry, which contained thirty-three elements, including light and caloric. By 1818, Jöns Jakob Berzelius had determined atomic weights for forty-five of the forty-nine then-accepted elements. Dmitri Mendeleev had sixty-six elements in his periodic table of 1869.

From Boyle until the early 20th century, an element was defined as a pure substance that could not be decomposed into any simpler substance. Put another way, a chemical element cannot be transformed into other chemical elements by chemical processes. Elements during this time were generally distinguished by their atomic weights, a property measurable with fair accuracy by available analytical techniques.

Atomic definitions 

The 1913 discovery by English physicist Henry Moseley that the nuclear charge is the physical basis for an atom's atomic number, further refined when the nature of protons and neutrons became appreciated, eventually led to the current definition of an element based on atomic number (number of protons per atomic nucleus). The use of atomic numbers, rather than atomic weights, to distinguish elements has greater predictive value (since these numbers are integers), and also resolves some ambiguities in the chemistry-based view due to varying properties of isotopes and allotropes within the same element. Currently, IUPAC defines an element to exist if it has isotopes with a lifetime longer than the 10−14 seconds it takes the nucleus to form an electronic cloud.

By 1914, seventy-two elements were known, all naturally occurring. The remaining naturally occurring elements were discovered or isolated in subsequent decades, and various additional elements have also been produced synthetically, with much of that work pioneered by Glenn T. Seaborg. In 1955, element 101 was discovered and named mendelevium in honor of D.I. Mendeleev, the first to arrange the elements in a periodic manner.

Discovery and recognition of various elements 

Ten materials familiar to various prehistoric cultures are now known to be chemical elements: Carbon, copper, gold, iron, lead, mercury, silver, sulfur, tin, and zinc. Three additional materials now accepted as elements, arsenic, antimony, and bismuth, were recognized as distinct substances prior to 1500 AD. Phosphorus, cobalt, and platinum were isolated before 1750.

Most of the remaining naturally occurring chemical elements were identified and characterized by 1900, including:
 Such now-familiar industrial materials as aluminium, silicon, nickel, chromium, magnesium, and tungsten
 Reactive metals such as lithium, sodium, potassium, and calcium
 The halogens fluorine, chlorine, bromine, and iodine
 Gases such as hydrogen, oxygen, nitrogen, helium, argon, and neon
 Most of the rare-earth elements, including cerium, lanthanum, gadolinium, and neodymium.
 The more common radioactive elements, including uranium, thorium, radium, and radon

Elements isolated or produced since 1900 include:
 The three remaining undiscovered regularly occurring stable natural elements: hafnium, lutetium, and rhenium
 Plutonium, which was first produced synthetically in 1940 by Glenn T. Seaborg, but is now also known from a few long-persisting natural occurrences
 The three incidentally occurring natural elements (neptunium, promethium, and technetium), which were all first produced synthetically but later discovered in trace amounts in certain geological samples
 Four scarce decay products of uranium or thorium (astatine, francium, actinium, and protactinium), and
 Various synthetic transuranic elements, beginning with americium and curium

Recently discovered elements
The first transuranium element (element with atomic number greater than 92) discovered was neptunium in 1940. Since 1999 claims for the discovery of new elements have been considered by the IUPAC/IUPAP Joint Working Party. As of January 2016, all 118 elements have been confirmed as discovered by IUPAC. The discovery of element 112 was acknowledged in 2009, and the name copernicium and the atomic symbol Cn were suggested for it. The name and symbol were officially endorsed by IUPAC on 19 February 2010. The heaviest element that is believed to have been synthesized to date is element 118, oganesson, on 9 October 2006, by the Flerov Laboratory of Nuclear Reactions in Dubna, Russia. Tennessine, element 117 was the latest element claimed to be discovered, in 2009. On 28 November 2016, scientists at the IUPAC officially recognized the names for four of the newest chemical elements, with atomic numbers 113, 115, 117, and 118.

List of the 118 known chemical elements

The following sortable table shows the 118 known chemical elements.
 Atomic number, Element, and Symbol all serve independently as unique identifiers.
 Element names are those accepted by IUPAC. 
 Block indicates the periodic table block for each element: red = s-block, yellow = p-block, blue = d-block, green = f-block.
 Group and period refer to an element's position in the periodic table. Group numbers here show the currently accepted numbering; for older numberings, see Group (periodic table).

See also 

 Biological roles of the elements
 Chemical database
 Discovery of the chemical elements
 Element collecting
 Fictional element
 Goldschmidt classification
 Island of stability
 List of nuclides
 List of the elements' densities
 Mineral (nutrient)
 Periodic Systems of Small Molecules
 Prices of chemical elements
 Systematic element name
 Table of nuclides
 Timeline of chemical element discoveries
 Roles of chemical elements

References

Further reading 

 
 
 
 
 
 
 
 XML on-line corrected version: created by M. Nic, J. Jirat, B. Kosata; updates compiled by A. Jenkins

External links 
 Videos for each element by the University of Nottingham
 "Chemical Elements", In Our Time, BBC Radio 4 discussion with Paul Strathern, Mary Archer and John Murrell (25 May 2000)

 
Chemistry